Robert Porter (after 1603–1648) was a sword-cutler in Birmingham who supported the Parliamentary cause in the English Civil War.

Biography
Robert Porter was the third son of Henry Porter (died c. 1619) and Anne, daughter of William Colmore, of New Hall, Birmingham.

At the start of the Civil War started Porter owned a water mill called Town Mill in Digbeth Street, Birmingham. It was located on a stream below Malt, or Moat, Mill which was fed by waters from the moat of the manor house of Birmingham and then flowed into the River Rea. Porter had converted Town Mill from a corn mill into a blade mill, and being, like his brother-in-law, Waldive Willington (Governor of Tamworth Castle), a keen supporter of the Parliamentary cause would only supply swords to the Parliamentary side.

In 1642, before the Battle of Edgehill the first pitched battle of the Civil War, Birmingham supplied the Parliamentary army of Robert Devereux, Earl of Essex with about 15,000 sword blades, many of which probably came from Porter's blade mill, because when Prince Rupert briefly held Birmingham after the Battle of Camp Hill (3 April 1643), Porter's Mill was singled out and burnt down by local Royalists ("malignants" as they were described by supporters of Parliament) to prevent it supplying further blades to the Parliamentary armies.

Porter not only made blades, but knew how to use them. He was a captain in the Parliamentary cavalry during the Battle of Camp Hill, and is reputed to be the author of a letter published in a propaganda pamphlet by the Parliamentary side (see A True Relation of Prince Rvpert's Barbarous Cruelly against the Towne of Brumingham). Later in the Civil War he was treasurer of the Parliamentary garrison of Edgbaston Hall under the command of "Tinker" Fox.

Porter was a trustee of Field's Charity and the Lench's Trust in Birmingham. He died in 1648.

Family
Porter's two sons Josiah and Samual, both continued as sword-cutlers, or "long-cutlers" as they were sometimes called. Samuel who lived at New Hall, dabbled in coal mines, without benefit to himself of his relatives.

Notes

References

Attribution:

Further reading
 "Mr. Porter had furnished the Parliamentary army with 15,000 blades"
 "Robert Porter, made 15,000 swords for the Parliamentary army, a proceeding which brought trouble to the town"
 "(Mr. Richard Porter) who supplied 15,000 to the Earl of Essex."
 "Mr. Richard Porter, supplied 15,000 swords to the parliamentary general, but no one in the town would supply the king's forces for love or money."
. "A royalist tract called A letter written from Walsall, notes the despatch of 15,000 swords to the Earl of Essex."

1648 deaths
Roundheads
Year of birth uncertain
Swordsmiths